Bakhshabad (also Romanized as Bakhshābād) is a village in Mahyar Rural District, in the Central District of Qaen County, South Khorasan Province, Iran. At the 2006 census, its population was 86, in 14 families.

References 

Populated places in Qaen County